Gandersheim Abbey is a former house of secular canonesses (Frauenstift) in the present town of Bad Gandersheim in Lower Saxony, Germany. It was founded in 852 by Duke Liudolf of Saxony, progenitor of the Liudolfing or Ottonian dynasty, whose rich endowments ensured its stability and prosperity.

The "Imperial free secular foundation of Gandersheim" (Kaiserlich freies weltliches Reichsstift Gandersheim), as it was officially known from the 13th century to its dissolution in 1810, was a community of the unmarried daughters of the high nobility, leading a godly life but not under monastic vows, which is the meaning of the word "secular" in the title.

Church 

In the collegiate church the original Romanesque church building is still visible, with Gothic extensions. It is a cruciform basilica with two towers on the westwork, consisting of a flat-roofed nave  and two vaulted side-aisles. The transept has a square crossing with more or less square arms, with a square choir to the east. Beneath the crossing choir is a hall-crypt. The westwork consist of two towers and a connecting two-storey block; it originally had in addition a projecting entrance hall, also on two storeys, the "paradise". The present church building, which has been subject to restoration in the 19th and 20th centuries, was begun in about 1100 and dedicated in 1168. Remains of the previous building are incorporated into the present structure.

History

Foundation 
Gandersheim Abbey was a proprietary foundation by Duke Liudolf of Saxony and his wife Oda, who during a pilgrimage to Rome in 846 obtained the permission of Pope Sergius II for the new establishment and also the relics of the sainted former popes Anastasius and Innocent, who are still the patron saints of the abbey church. The community settled first at Brunshausen (Brunistishusun). The first abbess was Hathumod, a daughter of Liudolf, as were the two succeeding abbesses. In 856 construction began on the church at Gandersheim and in 881 Bishop Wigbert dedicated it to the Saints Anastasius, Innocent and John the Baptist, after which the community moved in.

Already in 877 King Louis the Younger placed the abbey under the protection of the Empire, which gave it extensive independence. In 919 King Henry I granted it Imperial immediacy. The close connection to the Empire meant that the abbey was obliged to provide accommodation to the German kings on their travels, and numerous royal visits are recorded.

Middle Ages 
The establishment of the abbey by the founder of the Liudolfingers gave it especial importance during the Ottonian period. Until the foundation of Quedlinburg Abbey in 936, Gandersheim was among the most important Ottonian family institutions, and its church was one of the Ottonian burial places.

The canonesses, commonly known as Stiftsdamen, were allowed private property and, as they had taken no vows, were free at any time to leave the abbey. The Ottonian and Salian kings and their entourages often stayed in Gandersheim, and the canonesses were by no means remote from the world. Apart from the memorial Masses for the founding family, one of the main duties of the canonesses was the education of the daughters of the nobility (who were not obliged to become canonesses themselves).

One of the abbey's best-known canonesses was Roswitha of Gandersheim, famous as the first female poet of the German people. During a period of approximately 20 years – from about 950 to 970 or so – she wrote historical poetry, spiritual pieces and dramas, and the Gesta Ottonis, expressing her veneration of Otto I. She wrote in Latin.

In the Great Gandersheim Conflict, as it is called, originating from the turn of the 10th and 11th centuries, the Bishop of Hildesheim asserted claims over the abbey and its estates, which were located in an area where the boundaries between the Bishopric of Hildesheim and the Archbishop of Mainz were unclear. The pressure from Hildesheim moved the abbey increasingly into the sphere of Mainz. The situation was only eventually resolved by a privilege of Pope Innocent III of 22 June 1206 freeing the abbey once and for all from all claims of Hildesheim, and granting the abbesses the title of Imperial princesses (Reichsfürstinnen).

With the death of the last Salian king in 1125 the importance of the abbey began to diminish and it came more and more under the influence of the local territorial rulers. The Welfs in particular attempted to gain control over the abbey, until its dissolution. The abbey was not able to establish its own territorial lordship. No later than the mid-1270s, the Dukes of Brunswick succeeded in obtaining the Vogtei of the abbey and in the late 13th century built a castle in Gandersheim. Another way to gain influence over the abbey was to place relatives in the abbess's chair. This took the Dukes of Brunswick-Lüneburg rather longer to achieve, but they were at last successful in 1402 with the election of their first family abbess, Sophia III, Princess of Brunswick-Lüneburg.

Reformation 
The Reformation was first introduced into the Principality of Brunswick-Wolfenbüttel in 1542 when troops of the Schmalkaldic League occupied it. The Reformers ignored the abbey's Imperial immediacy and ordained the use of Lutheran church services, the introduction of which however the canonesses were able to postpone on account of the absence of the prioress (Dekanin) who was governing the abbey on behalf of the seven-year-old abbess. The townspeople of Gandersheim had received the Reformation enthusiastically and on 13 July 1543 undertook an iconoclastic attack on the abbey church, where they destroyed images and altars. Henry V changed his mind however and the principality changed back to Roman Catholicism. He made good at least some of the damages, and the church was re-dedicated.

In 1568 the Reformation was again implemented under Julius, Duke of Brunswick-Lüneburg. The abbey and its dependencies at Brunshausen and Clus became Lutheran, and the Marienkloster and the Franciscan friaries were suppressed. A period now began of conflict between the abbess and the duke as both tried to extend their spheres of influence, a conflict which was not settled until 1593 when a treaty finally settled the points of disagreement.

Baroque 

Under the abbesses Henriette Christine of Brunswick-Wolfenbüttel and Elisabeth Ernestine of Saxe-Meiningen there began a new golden age of the abbey. The abbesses promoted arts and sciences. Elisabeth Ernestine Antonie had the summer castle at Brunshausen built, as well as the Baroque wing of the abbey with the Kaisers' Hall (Kaisersaal), and she refurbished the church.

Dissolution 
In 1802, faced with imminent secularisation, the abbey surrendered its Imperial immediacy to the sovereignty of the Dukes of Brunswick-Wolfenbüttel, thus ending the centuries-long struggle with the Welfs.

During the French occupation Gandersheim belonged to the Kingdom of Westphalia. The abbess, who had fled, was permitted by Napoleon to return to the abbey and to live there until her death on 10 March 1810, after which there were no further elections for a successor. The abbey was dissolved and its assets were taken by the Westphalian crown, with the remaining occupants pensioned off.

Even after the end of the Kingdom of Westphalia in 1813 the Duchy of Brunswick did not restore the abbey.

Present day 
The abbey is now used by the Evangelical-Lutheran parochial group of St. Anastasius and St. Innocent. During restoration works in 1997 there came to light some of the old church treasure: relics, textiles and reliquaries. These have been on display since March 2006.

List of abbesses 

 Hathumod     852–74 (daughter of Liudolf, the founder)
 Gerberga I     874–96/7 (daughter of Liudolf, the founder)
 Christina I     896/7–919 (daughter of Liudolf, the founder)
 Liudgard I     919–23
 Hrotsuit (Rotsuita)     923–33
 Wendelgard (Windilgardis, Wildigrat)     933–49
 Gerberga II     949–1001
 Sophie I     1001–39
 Adelheid I     1039–43 (daughter of Emperor Otto II)
 Beatrice I     1044–61 (daughter of Emperor Henry III)
 Adelheid II     1061–96 (daughter of Emperor Henry III)
 Adelheid III     1096–1104
 Frederun (Vrederun)     1104–11
 Agnes I     1111–25
 Bertha I     1126–30
 Liutgard II     1130/31–52
 Adelheid IV, daughter of Fredrick II, Count of Sommerschenburg, and Countess Lutgard of Stade     1152/53–84
 Adelheid V (of Thuringia)     1184–96
 Mechthild I (of Wohldenberg)     1196–1223
 Bertha II     1223–52
 Margarete I (of Plesse)     1253–1305
 Mechthild II (of Wohldenberg)     1305–16
 Sophia II (of Büren)     1317–31
 Jutta (Judith) (of Schwalenberg)     1331–57
 Ermegardis (of Schwalenberg)     1357–58
 Lutgard III (of Hammerstein)     1359–1402
 Sophia III, Duchess of Brunswick-Lüneburg     1402–12
 Agnes II of Brunswick-Grubenhagen     1412–39
 Elisabeth of Dorstadt     1439
 Elisabeth (Ilse), Duchess of Brunswick-Grubenhagen     1439–52
 Sophia IV, Duchess of Brunswick-Grubenhagen     (1452) 1467–85
 Walburg (of Spiegelberg), rival abbess     1452–67
 Agnes III, Princess of Anhalt     1485–04
 Gertrud, Countess of Regenstein-Blankenburg     1504–31
 Katharina, Countess of Hohenstein, rival abbess     1504–36
 Maria, Duchess of Brunswick-Wolfenbüttel     1532–39
 Clara, Duchess of Brunswick-Wolfenbüttel     1539–47
 Magdalena of Chlum     1547–77
 Margareta of Chlum     1577–89
 Elisabeth, Duchess of Brunswick-Wolfenbüttel, rival abbess     1577–82
 Margarete of Warberg, rival abbess     1582–87
 Anna Erica (Erich), Countess of Waldeck     1589–1611
 Dorothea Augusta, Duchess of Brunswick-Wolfenbüttel     1611–26
 Catharina Elisabeth, Countess of Oldenburg 1626–49
 Maria Sabina, Countess of Solms     1650–65
 Dorothea Hedwig, Princess of Schleswig-Holstein     1665–78
 Christine Sophie,  Duchess of Brunswick-Wolfenbüttel      1678–81
 Christina II, Duchess of Mecklenburg-Schwerin     1681–93
  Henriette Christine, Duchess of Brunswick-Wolfenbüttel     1693–1712
 Marie Elisabeth, Duchess of Mecklenburg-Schwerin     1712–13
 Elisabeth Ernestine Antonie, Duchess of Saxe-Meiningen    1713–66
 Therese Natalie, Duchess of Brunswick-Wolfenbüttel     1767–78
 Augusta Dorothea, Duchess of Brunswick-Wolfenbüttel     1778–1810

Burials 
Agnes of Brunswick-Grubenhagen
Sophia I, Abbess of Gandersheim
Liudolf, Duke of Saxony

Notes

References 
 Goetting, Hans, 1973: Das reichsunmittelbare Kanonissenstift Gandersheim. In Max-Planck-Institut für Geschichte (ed.): Germania sacra: historisch-statistische Beschreibung der Kirche des Alten Reiches. Berlin/New York: de Gruyter. 
 Hoernes, Martin, and Röckelein, Hedwig (eds.), 2006: Gandersheim und Essen. Vergleichende Untersuchungen zu sächsischen Frauenstiften. In: Essener Forschungen zum Frauenstift (vol. 4). Essen: Klartext Verlag. 
 Portal zur Geschichte: Schätze neu entdecken! Auswahlkatalog (ed. Martin Hoernes and Thomas Labusiak). Delmenhorst 2007
 Wäß, Helga, 2006: Form und Wahrnehmung mitteldeutscher Gedächtnisskulptur im 14. Jahrhundert. Katalog ausgewählter Objekte vom Hohen Mittelalter bis zum Anfang des 15. Jahrhunderts (vol. 2, pp. 222 f). Bristol/Berlin: Tenea. 
 Friedrich, Ernst Andreas, 1989: Wenn Steine reden könnten. Hanover: Landbuch-Verlag.

External links 

 Gandersheim Abbey church: permanent exhibition  
 Bad Gandersheim official website 

Monasteries in Lower Saxony
Imperial abbeys
Lutheran women's religious houses
Gandersheim
Christian monasteries established in the 9th century
Lutheran churches converted from Roman Catholicism
Buildings and structures in Northeim (district)
1802 disestablishments in the Holy Roman Empire
Establishments in East Francia
10th-century establishments in Germany
9th-century churches in Germany
Religious buildings and structures completed in 852